Tsiranana may refer to:

People
Justine Tsiranana (c. 1918 – July 1999), the first First Lady of Madagascar 
Philibert Tsiranana, first President of Madagascar
Ruffine Tsiranana, a Malagasy Senator

Places
 Amborovy Airport, also known as Philibert Tsiranana Airport